The 1971 Meath Intermediate Football Championship is the 45th edition of the Meath GAA's premier club Gaelic football tournament for intermediate graded teams in County Meath, Ireland. The tournament consists of 24 teams. The championship starts with a group stage and then progresses to a knock out stage.

Oldcastle were relegated from the S.F.C. the previous year.

This year marked St. Colmcille's first year in existence as a club as Intermediate club Star of the Sea and Junior club Shallon amalgamated in the early part of 1971.

Ratoath and Cortown were promoted after claiming the 1970 Meath Junior Football Championship title and Junior 'A' Divisional runners-up spot respectively. This was only Cortown's second season in existence after being formed in 1969. Kilberry were also promoted from the J.A.F.C.

On 24 October 1971, Ballivor claimed their 2nd Intermediate championship title when they defeated Moylagh 3-2 to 1-5 in the final in Pairc Tailteann, and thus returned the top flight of Meath club football.

Ballinabrackey, Bellewstown St. Theresa's and Cortown were relegated to the 1972 J.F.C. Salesian College Warrenstown also stopped fielding teams in the Meath football championships at the end of the year.

Team changes
 

The following teams have changed division since the 1970 championship season.

From I.F.C.
Promoted to S.F.C.
 Dunderry  -  (Intermediate Champions)
 Syddan

Relegated to 1971 J.A.F.C.
 None

To I.F.C.
Regraded from S.F.C.
 Oldcastle

Promoted from 1970 J.A.F.C.
 Ratoath - (Junior Champions)
 Cortown - (Junior 'A' Divisional Runners-Up)
 Kilberry

Group stage
There are 2 groups called Group A and B. The top two finishers in each group will qualify for the Semi-Finals.

Group A

Round 1:
 Castletown 0-9, 0-5 St. Mary's, Seneschalstown, 14/3/1971,
 Cortown 0-6, 0-5 Oldcastle, Kells, 14/3/1971,
 Kilmainhamwood 2-9, 1-2 Warrenstown, Kells, 14/3/1971,
 Ratoath +5, -5 Garryowen, Seneschalstown, 14/3/1971,
 Flathouse 1-7, 1-4 Bellewstown, Dunshaughlin, 14/3/1971,
 Rathkenny w, l St. Colmcille's, Duleek, 21/3/1971,

Round 2:
 Kilmainhamwood w, l Garryowen, Kells, 28/3/1971,
 St. Mary's v Bellewstown, Duleek, 28/3/1971,
 Ratoath w, l Warrenstown, ???, 28/3/1971,
 Oldcastle v St. Colmcille's, Kilberry, 28/3/1971,
 Flathouse w, l Cortown, Pairc Tailteann, 28/3/1971,
 Castletown 0-7, 1-4 Rathkenny, Kells, 22/8/1971,

Round 3:
 Oldcastle v Garryowen, Kells, 4/4/1971,
 St. Colmcille's v Bellewstown, Duleek, 4/4/1971,
 Flathouse w, l Kilmainhamwood, Seneschalstown, 4/4/1971,
 Rathkenny w, l Cortown, Gibbstown, 18/4/1971,
 Castletown 0-6, 0-4 Ratoath, Duleek, 23/5/1971,
 Warrenstown w, l St. Mary's,

Round 4:
 Oldcastle 1-5, 0-4 Bellewstown, Kilberry, 18/4/1971,
 Castletown 2-6, 2-3 Kilmainhamwood, Gibbstown, 18/4/1971,
 Garryowen 2-8, 3-1 Cortown, Kells, 9/5/1971,
 Rathkenny w, l St. Mary's, Seneschalstown, 9/5/1971,
 Flathouse w, l Ratoath, Dunshaughlin, 6/6/1971,
 St. Colmcille's w, l Warrenstown,

Round 5:
 Flathouse w, l St. Colmcille's, Seneschalstown, 18/4/1971,
 Castletown 5-12, 1-10 Oldcastle, Kells, 9/5/1971,
 Kilmainhamwood v Cortown, Kells, 16/5/1971,
 Garryowen v Bellewstown, Dunshaughlin, 16/5/1971,
 Ratoath v St. Mary's, Duleek, 13/6/1971,
 Rathkenny w, l Warrenstown,

Round 6:
 Castletown w, l St. Colmcille's, Seneschalstown, 16/5/1971,
 Flathouse w, l St. Mary's, Seneschalstown, 16/5/1971,
 Rathkenny w, l Garryowen, Pairc Tailteann, 23/5/1971,
 Kilmainhamwood 2-9, 1-5 Bellewstown, Kilberry, 23/5/1971,
 Ratoath 2-6, 1-8 Cortown, Seneschalstown, 4/7/1971,
 Oldcastle w, l Warrenstown,

Round 7:
 Ratoath v St. Colmcille's, Seneschalstown, 9/5/1971,
 Oldcastle v St. Mary's, Kilberry, 23/5/1971,
 Cortown v Bellewstown, Castletown, 6/6/1971,
 Flathouse w, l Castletown, Pairc Tailteann, 20/6/1971,
 Rathkenny w, l Kilmainhamwood,
 Garryowen w, l Warrenstown,

Round 8:
 St. Colmcille's 2-7, 2-6 Cortown, Kilmessan, 23/5/1971,
 Rathkenny w, l Oldcastle, Kells, 6/6/1971,
 Garryowen v St. Mary's, Castletown, 6/6/1971,
 Castletown w, l Bellestown, Seneschalstown, 4/7/1971,
 Flathouse w, l Warrenstown,
 Kilmainhamwood v Ratoath,

Round 9:
 St. Mary's v St. Colmcille's, Seneschalstown, 20/6/1971,
 Flathouse 0-6, 0-5 Rathkenny, Kilmessan, 4/7/1971,
 Rathkenny w, l Oldcastle, Ballinlough, 4/7/1971,
 Castletown 1-11, 0-6 Garryowen, Pairc Tailteann, 11/7/1971,
 Ratoath v Bellewstown,
 Cortown w, l Warrenstown,

Round 10:
 Rathkenny w, l Bellewstown, Duleek, 13/6/1971,
 Flathouse w, l Garryowen, Dunshaughlin, 11/7/1971,
 Kilmainhamwood v St. Colmcille's, Kilberry, 11/7/1971,
 Cortown v St. Mary's, Kilberry, 11/7/1971,
 Oldcastle v Ratoath, Trim, 12/9/1971,
 Castletown w, l Warrenstown,

Round 11:
 Garryowen v St. Colmcille's, Seneschalstown, 13/6/1971,
 Flathouse 2-9, 0-4 Oldcastle, Pairc Tailteann, 11/7/1971,
 Kilmainhamwood v St. Mary's,
 Castletown w, l Cortown,
 Bellewstown w, l Warrenstown,
 Rathkenny w, l Ratoath,

 Many results unavailable.

Group B

Round 1:
 Kilallon 0-13, 0-6 Ballinabrackey, Trim, 14/3/1971,
 St. Peter's Dunboyne 2-6, 0-5 Kilberry, Dunshaughlin, 14/3/1971,
 Moylagh w, l Dunshaughlin, Kildalkey, 29/3/1971,
 Bohermeen w, l Martinstown, Kildalkey, 29/3/1971,
 Ballivor 3-12, 0-9 Enfield, Summerhill, 29/3/1971,
 Martry v Summerhill,

Round 2:
 Kilallon 0-11, 0-7 Kilberry, Kells, 28/3/1971,
 Dunshaughlin v Enfield, Summerhill, 4/4/1971,
 Ballinabrackey +2, -2 Martinstown, Trim, 25/4/1971,
 St. Peter's Dunboyne +1, -1 Martry, Pairc Tailteann, 25/4/1971,
 Ballivor 1-10, 3-3 Moylagh, Athboy, 9/5/1971,
 Summerhill 3-7, 0-11 Bohermeen, Kilmessan, 9/5/1971,

Round 3:
 Dunshaughlin 2-10, 2-1 Kilallon, Trim, 9/5/1971,
 Martry 1-7, 1-5 Martinstown, Kildalkey, 9/5/1971,
 Ballinabrackey v Enfield, Longwood, 16/5/1971,
 Summerhill 1-9, 0-9 Ballivor, Athboy, 23/5/1971,
 Bohermeen 2-8, 0-3 Kilberry, Gibbstown, 23/5/1971,
 Moylagh 3-12, 0-6 St. Peter's Dunboyne, Kildalkey, 23/5/1971,

Round 4:
 Moylagh w, l Ballinabrackey, Kildalkey, 30/5/1971,
 St. Peter's Dunboyne 2-10, 1-10 Enfield, Kilcloon, 9/5/1971,
 Bohermeen v Dunshaughlin, Pairc Tailteann, 16/5/1971,
 Ballivor +1, -1 Martry, Athboy, 6/6/1971
 Summerhill 3-9, 0-3 Kilberry, Trim, 6/6/1971,
 Martinstown v Kilallon, Kildalkey, 19/9/1971,

Round 5:
 Kilallon 2-11, 1-4 Enfield, Kildalkey, 6/6/1971,
 Moylagh 5-5, 2-8 Martry, Athboy, 20/6/1971,
 St. Peter's Dunboyne 4-6, 2-6 Bohermeen, Summerhill, 4/7/1971,
 Ballivor w/o, scr Kilberry, Kells, 22/8/1971,
 Dunshaughlin v Martinstown,
 Summerhill w, l Ballinabrackey,

Round 6:
 Martry 2-9, 2-7 Enfield, Kildalkey, 23/5/1971,
 St. Peter's Dunboyne w, l Kilallon, Trim, 12/9/1971,
 Moylagh w, l Kilberry,
 Bohermeen v Ballinabrackey,
 Summerhill v Dunshaughlin
 Martinstown w, l Ballivor,

Round 7:
 Moylagh w, l Martinstown, Ballinlough, 16/5/1971,
 Kilallon 1-6, 1-5 Summerhill, Trim, 4/7/1971,
 Ballivor 4-6, 0-4 Dunshaughlin, Trim, 4/7/1971,
 Martry w, l Kilberry,
 Bohermeen v Enfield,
 St. Peter's Dunboyne w, l Ballinabrackey,

Round 8:
 Ballinabrackey w, l Kilberry, Summerhill, 9/5/1971,
 Ballivor w, l Killalon, Athboy, 15/8/1971,
 Martry v Bohermeen, Kells, 15/8/1971,
 Summerhill w, l Martinstown,
 St. Peter's Dunboyne v Dunshaughlin,
 Moylagh w, l Enfield,

Round 9:
 Enfield w, l Kilberry, Kilmessan, 20/6/1971,
 Kilallon 2-12, 1-3 Bohermeen, Athboy, 11/7/1971,
 Moylagh w, l Summerhill, Athboy, 15/8/1971,
 Ballivor w, l Ballinabrackey,
 Dunshaughlin v Martry,
 St. Peter's Dunboyne w, l Martinstown,

Round 10:
 Dunshaughlin 2-9, 0-5 Ballinabrackey, Trim, 23/5/1971,
 Moylagh w, l Bohermeen, Kells, 13/6/1971,
 Martry v Kilallon, Athboy, 29/8/1971,
 Ballivor 2-15, 0-4 St. Peter's Dunboyne, Trim, 29/8/1971,
 Summerhill w, l Enfield,
 Martinstown w, l Kilberry,

Round 11:
 Dunshaughlin w, l Kilberry, Kilmessan, 18/7/1971,
 Moylagh w, l Kilallon, Kells, 18/7/1971,
 Summerhill v St. Peter's Dunboyne, Athboy, 18/7/1971,
 Ballivor 3-14, 1-9 Bohermeen, Kildalkey, 12/9/1971,
 Enfield v Martinstown, 
 Martry v Ballinabrackey,

 Not all results available

Knock-out Stages
The teams in the Semi-Finals are the first and second placed teams from each group.

Semi-Final:
 Ballivor 1-12, 1-4 Flathouse, Kilmessan, 19/9/1971,
 Moylagh 1-9, 0-9 Castletown, Kells, 19/9/1971,
 
Final & Final Replay:
 Ballivor 0-11, 1-8 Moylagh, Pairc Tailteann, 3/10/1971,
 Ballivor 3-2, 1-5 Moylagh, Pairc Tailteann, 24/10/1971,

References

External links

Meath Intermediate Football Championship
Meath Intermediate Football Championship